Lindera lucida is a species of flowering plant in the family Lauraceae. It is found in Malaysia.

Dihydrochalcones (3′,5′-dihydroxy-2′,4′,6′-trimethoxydihydrochalcone, methyl linderone, 5-hydroxy-6,7,8-trimethoxyflavone (alnetin) and 2′-hydroxy-3′,4′,5′,6′-tetramethoxydihydrochalcone (dihydrokanakugiol) can be found in twigs of L. lucida.

References

lucida
Plants described in 1900
Taxa named by Jacob Gijsbert Boerlage
Taxa named by Carl Ludwig Blume